Heinrich von Bobenhausen (c. 1514 - March 21, 1595) was the 41st Grandmaster of the Teutonic Knights, reigning for close to two decades from 1572 to 1590.

Biography 
Heinrich heralded from the Franconian von Bobenhausen noble family. He joined the Teutonic Order in 1547. He was Komtur of Mergentheim from 1547 to 1549, Komtur of Frankfurt from 1549, and Landkomtur of the Bailiwick of Franconia from 1557. He was also Komtur of Regensburg until 1565, when then Grandmaster Wolfgang Schutzbar revoked his position.

After Georg Hund's death in 1572, Heinrich was elected Grandmaster of the Teutonic Knights on March 17. In 1576, Holy Roman Emperor Maximilian II appointed him as administrator of the Princely Abbey of Fulda. 

Unlike his predecessor, he was much more lenient towards Protestants and less supportive of the counter-reformation, which deteriorated relations between him Maximilian II. Relations only worsened with Maximilian's successor, Rudolf II, who in 1585, forced Heinrich into being a coadjutor, with him and Rudolf both sharing the title of Grandmaster. Rudolf's brother and Maximilian II's son, Maximilian III, would attempt to wrestle control of the order away from Heinrich. Maximilian III's efforts were largely irresistible. After Maximilian took the oath on October 20, 1585, Heinrich was forced to surrender the Mergentheim Palace, the residence of the Teutonic Grandmaster since 1527. The following year in 1586, Heinrich was forced to surrender the Teutonic coat of arms, regalia, and the titles of Hochmeister and Deutschmeister. On February 20, he was forced to give up the administration of the Imperial Abbey of Fulda to Maximilian. Heinrich attempted to retake control of the order, however, the governor of Mergentheim halted his efforts in 1587.

In 1585, shortly after the Hapsburgs began to seize power over the order, Heinrich retired to the Deutschmeister's chamber house in Weissenburg, Alsace. In 1590, having already de facto lost all power over the Teutonic Order, Heinrich officially relinquished his position of Grandmaster of the Teutonic Knights. He died in Weissenberg on March 21, 1595 and was buried in the local Kommendenkirc (or Commandery Church).

References 

1595 deaths
Grand Masters of the Teutonic Order
1514 births